South Portland Street Synagogue was a synagogue regarded as the Jewish religious centre of Glasgow between 1901 and its closure in 1974. It was located at 85-89 South Portland Street in the Gorbals are of the city and was designed by James Chalmers. The building was known by several names during its lifespan including the South Side Synagogue, the Great Synagogue and the Great Central Synagogue.

History 
On opening in 1901, the religious leaders of the congregation were Reverend Abraham Cantor and Reverend Isaac Bridge. At the time of opening, South Portland Street was the largest synagogue in Scotland, with seating for 1,000 people and the option for up to 1,600 people to access services in the Prayer Hall with the opening of folding doors.

The Synagogue was in a union with Garnethill Synagogue from 1886/7 to 1898 and from 1896 until 1906 was part of the United Synagogue of Glasgow. In 1956, the building merged with the congregation of the New Central Synagogue in Hospital Street to form the Great Central Synagogue.

The Synagogue was the longest-surviving synagogue in the Gorbals and was considered to be the last Jewish building in the area, and was the centre of traditional Jewish life until it closed in 1974.

Congregation 
The congregation of the Synagogue was formed in 1881, in response to the large numbers of Jewish immigrants who were moving to the Gorbals area. As a result of this immigration, a number of synagogues were established in the Gorbals, of which South Portland Street was the largest.

References

Ashkenazi Jewish culture in Scotland
Ashkenazi synagogues
Synagogues in Glasgow
Gorbals
Orthodox synagogues in the United Kingdom
Former synagogues in the United Kingdom
Synagogues completed in 1901
Buildings and structures demolished in 1974